Buntowo  is a village in the administrative district of Gmina Złotów, within Złotów County, Greater Poland Voivodeship, in west-central Poland. 

For centuries, the area was part of the Kingdom of Poland until the First Partition of Poland in 1772. From 1871 to 1945 the area was part of Germany. For more on its history, see Złotów County.

The village has a population of 320.

References

Buntowo